"Welcome to Heartlight" is a Kenny Loggins song from his 1982 concept album, High Adventure.

While many fans perceive this song as being inspired by the Steven Spielberg film E.T. the Extra-Terrestrial, it is really about a school in Southern California that's actually called "Heartlight". The song was inspired by writings from students from that school.  On most pressings of High Adventure and on some Loggins greatest hits compilation albums, it is officially titled simply "Heartlight".  The title was expanded to "Welcome to Heartlight" to avoid confusion with Neil Diamond's song also called "Heartlight".

It was released as a single in early 1983 and peaked at number 24 on the U.S. Billboard Hot 100 and number 17 on the Adult Contemporary chart.

Personnel
Kenny Loggins – lead vocals, guitar, guitar solo
Mike Hamilton – guitar
Vernon Porter – bass guitar 
Tris Imboden –  drums 
Steve Forman – percussion
Paulinho da Costa – congas
The Heartlight School Singers and Dancers Christ Memorial Youth Choir – choir 
Phyllis St. James – choir contractor
B. J. Crouch & Mrs. Norman Basely —  choir directors

References

1982 songs
1983 singles
Kenny Loggins songs
Songs written by Kenny Loggins
Columbia Records singles